Yevgeni Vladimirovich Yezhov (born 11 February 1995) is a Russian football defender.

Club career
He made his professional debut in the Russian Professional Football League for FC Spartak-2 Moscow on 25 May 2014 in a game against FC Oryol.

He made his Russian Football Premier League debut on 21 March 2015 for FC Arsenal Tula in a game against PFC CSKA Moscow.

References

External links
 

1995 births
People from Zhukovsky District, Bryansk Oblast
Living people
Russian footballers
Association football defenders
Russian Premier League players
FC Arsenal Tula players
FC Torpedo Moscow players
FC Khimik-Arsenal players
FC Spartak-2 Moscow players
Sportspeople from Bryansk Oblast